Nanzi Station (formerly Nanzih Station) is a railway station on the Taiwan Railways Administration West Coast line located in Nanzih District, Kaohsiung, Taiwan.

Around the station
Kaohsiung Metro Metropolitan Park Station

History
The railway station was opened on 29 November 1900.

See also
 List of railway stations in Taiwan

References

1900 establishments in Taiwan
Railway stations in Kaohsiung
Railway stations opened in 1900
Railway stations served by Taiwan Railways Administration